In moral and political philosophy, the social contract is a theory or model that originated during the Age of Enlightenment and usually, although not always, concerns the legitimacy of the authority of the state over the individual.

Social contract arguments typically are that individuals have consented, either explicitly or tacitly, to surrender some of their freedoms and submit to the authority (of the ruler, or to the decision of a majority) in exchange for protection of their remaining rights or maintenance of the social order. The relation between natural and legal rights is often a topic of social contract theory. The term takes its name from The Social Contract (French: Du contrat social ou Principes du droit politique), a 1762 book by Jean-Jacques Rousseau that discussed this concept. Although the antecedents of social contract theory are found in antiquity, in Greek and Stoic philosophy and Roman and Canon Law, the heyday of the social contract was the mid-17th to early 19th centuries, when it emerged as the leading doctrine of political legitimacy.

The starting point for most social contract theories is an examination of the human condition absent of any political order (termed the "state of nature" by Thomas Hobbes). In this condition, individuals' actions are bound only by their personal power and conscience. From this shared starting point, social contract theorists seek to demonstrate why rational individuals would voluntarily consent to give up their natural freedom to obtain the benefits of political order.

Prominent 17th- and 18th-century theorists of the social contract and natural rights included Hugo de Groot (1625), Thomas Hobbes (1651), Samuel von Pufendorf (1673), John Locke (1689), Jean-Jacques Rousseau (1762) and Immanuel Kant (1797), each approaching the concept of political authority differently. Grotius posited that individual humans had natural rights. 
Thomas Hobbes famously said that in a "state of nature", human life would be "solitary, poor, nasty, brutish and short". In the absence of political order and law, everyone would have unlimited natural freedoms, including the "right to all things" and thus the freedom to plunder, rape and murder; there would be an endless "war of all against all" (bellum omnium contra omnes). To avoid this, free men contract with each other to establish political community (civil society) through a social contract in which they all gain security in return for subjecting themselves to an absolute sovereign, one man or an assembly of men. Though the sovereign's edicts may well be arbitrary and tyrannical, Hobbes saw absolute government as the only alternative to the terrifying anarchy of a state of nature. Hobbes asserted that humans consent to abdicate their rights in favor of the absolute authority of government (whether monarchical or parliamentary).

Alternatively, Locke and Rousseau argued that we gain civil rights in return for accepting the obligation to respect and defend the rights of others, giving up some freedoms to do so.

The central assertion that social contract theory approaches is that law and political order are not natural, but human creations. The social contract and the political order it creates are simply the means towards an end—the benefit of the individuals involved—and legitimate only to the extent that they fulfill their part of the agreement. Hobbes argued that government is not a party to the original contract and citizens are not obligated to submit to the government when it is too weak to act effectively to suppress factionalism and civil unrest.

Social contract theories were eclipsed in the 19thcentury in favor of utilitarianism, Hegelianism and Marxism; they were revived in the 20thcentury, notably in the form of a thought experiment by John Rawls.

Overview

The model of the social contract 
There is a general form of social contract theories, which is: I chooses R in M and this gives I* reason to endorse and comply with R in the real world insofar as the reasons I has for choosing R in M are (or can be) shared by I*.With M being the deliberative setting; R rules, principles or institutions; I the (hypothetical) people in original position or state of nature making the social contract; and I* being the individuals in the real world following the social contract.

History 
The concept of the social contract was originally posed by Glaucon, as described by Plato in The Republic, BookII.

The social contract theory also appears in Crito, another dialogue from Plato.  Over time, the social contract theory became more widespread after Epicurus (341-270 BC), the first philosopher who saw justice as a social contract, and not as existing in Nature due to divine intervention (see below and also Epicurean ethics), decided to bring the theory to the forefront of his society.  As time went on, philosophers of traditional political and social thought, such as Locke, Hobbes, and Rousseau put forward their opinions on social contract, which then caused the topic to become much more mainstream.

Classical thought
Social contract formulations are preserved in many of the world's oldest records. The Indian Buddhist text of the second century BCE, Mahāvastu, recounts the legend of Mahasammata. The story goes as follows:

In his rock edicts, the Indian Buddhist king Asoka was said to have argued for a broad and far-reaching social contract. The Buddhist vinaya also reflects social contracts expected of the monks; one such instance is when the people of a certain town complained about monks felling saka trees, the Buddha tells his monks that they must stop and give way to social norms.

Epicurus in the fourth century BCE seemed to have had a strong sense of social contract, with justice and law being rooted in mutual agreement and advantage, as evidenced by these lines, among others, from his Principal Doctrines (see also Epicurean ethics):

Renaissance developments
Quentin Skinner has argued that several critical modern innovations in contract theory are found in the writings from French Calvinists and Huguenots, whose work in turn was invoked by writers in the Low Countries who objected to their subjection to Spain and, later still, by Catholics in England. Francisco Suárez (1548–1617), from the School of Salamanca, might be considered an early theorist of the social contract, theorizing natural law in an attempt to limit the divine right of absolute monarchy. All of these groups were led to articulate notions of popular sovereignty by means of a social covenant or contract, and all of these arguments began with proto-"state of nature" arguments, to the effect that the basis of politics is that everyone is by nature free of subjection to any government.

These arguments, however, relied on a corporatist theory found in Roman law, according to which "a populus" can exist as a distinct legal entity. Thus, these arguments held that a group of people can join a government because it has the capacity to exercise a single will and make decisions with a single voice in the absence of sovereign authority—a notion rejected by Hobbes and later contract theorists.

Philosophers

Thomas Hobbes' Leviathan (1651)

The first modern philosopher to articulate a detailed contract theory was Thomas Hobbes (1588–1679). According to Hobbes, the lives of individuals in the state of nature were "solitary, poor, nasty, brutish and short", a state in which self-interest and the absence of rights and contracts prevented the "social", or society. Life was "anarchic" (without leadership or the concept of sovereignty). Individuals in the state of nature were apolitical and asocial. This state of nature is followed by the social contract.

The social contract was seen as an "occurrence" during which individuals came together and ceded some of their individual rights so that others would cede theirs. This resulted in the establishment of the state, a sovereign entity like the individuals now under its rule used to be, which would create laws to regulate social interactions. Human life was thus no longer "a war of all against all".

The state system, which grew out of the social contract, was, however, also anarchic (without leadership). Just as the individuals in the state of nature had been sovereigns and thus guided by self-interest and the absence of rights, so states now acted in their self-interest in competition with each other. Just like the state of nature, states were thus bound to be in conflict because there was no sovereign over and above the state (more powerful) capable of imposing some system such as social-contract laws on everyone by force. Indeed, Hobbes' work helped to serve as a basis for the realism theories of international relations, advanced by E. H. Carr and Hans Morgenthau. Hobbes wrote in Leviathan that humans ("we") need the "terrour of some Power" otherwise humans will not heed the law of reciprocity, "(in summe) doing to others, as wee would be done to".

John Locke's Second Treatise of Government (1689)
John Locke's conception of the social contract differed from Hobbes' in several fundamental ways, retaining only the central notion that persons in a state of nature would willingly come together to form a state. Locke believed that individuals in a state of nature would be bound morally, by the Law of Nature, in which man has the "power... to preserve his property; that is, his life, liberty and estate against the injuries and attempts of other men". Without government to defend them against those seeking to injure or enslave them, Locke further believed people would have no security in their rights and would live in fear. Individuals, to Locke, would only agree to form a state that would provide, in part, a "neutral judge", acting to protect the lives, liberty, and property of those who lived within it.

While Hobbes argued for near-absolute authority, Locke argued for inviolate freedom under law in his Second Treatise of Government. Locke argued that a government's legitimacy comes from the citizens' delegation to the government of their absolute right of violence (reserving the inalienable right of self-defense or "self-preservation"), along with elements of other rights (e.g. property will be liable to taxation) as necessary to achieve the goal of security through granting the state a monopoly of violence, whereby the government, as an impartial judge, may use the collective force of the populace to administer and enforce the law, rather than each man acting as his own judge, jury, and executioner—the condition in the state of nature.

Jean-Jacques Rousseau's Du Contrat social (1762)
Jean-Jacques Rousseau (1712–1778), in his influential 1762 treatise The Social Contract, outlined a different version of social-contract theory, as the foundations of society based on the sovereignty of the ‘general will’.

Rousseau's political theory differs in important ways from that of Locke and Hobbes. Rousseau's collectivist conception is most evident in his development of the "luminous conception" (which he credited to Denis Diderot) of the ‘general will’. Summarised, the ‘general will’ is the power of all the citizens' collective interest - not to be confused with their individual interests.

Although Rousseau wrote that the British were perhaps at the time the freest people on earth, he did not approve of their representative government, nor any form of representative government. Rousseau believed that society was only legitimate when the sovereign (i.e. the ‘general will’) were the sole legislators. He also stated that the individual must accept “the total alienation to the whole community of each associate with all his rights”. In short, Rousseau meant that in order for the social contract to work, individuals must forfeit their rights to the whole so that such conditions were “equal for all".

Rousseau's striking phrase that man must "be forced to be free" should be understood this way: since the indivisible and inalienable popular sovereignty decides what is good for the whole, if an individual rejects this "civil liberty" in place of "natural liberty" and self interest, disobeying the law, he will be forced to listen to what was decided when the people acted as a collective (as citizens). Thus the law, inasmuch as it is created by the people acting as a body, is not a limitation of individual freedom, but rather its expression. The individual, as a citizen, explicitly agreed to be constrained if, as a private individual, he did not respect his own will as formulated in the general will.

Because laws represent the restraint of "natural liberty", they represent the leap made from humans in the state of nature into civil society. In this sense, the law is a civilizing force. Therefore Rousseau believed that the laws that govern a people help to mould their character.

Rousseau also analyses the social contract in terms of risk management,
thus suggesting the origins of the state as a form of mutual insurance.

Pierre-Joseph Proudhon's individualist social contract (1851)
While Rousseau's social contract is based on popular sovereignty and not on individual sovereignty, there are other theories espoused by individualists, libertarians, and anarchists that do not involve agreeing to anything more than negative rights and creates only a limited state, if any.

Pierre-Joseph Proudhon (1809–1865) advocated a conception of social contract that did not involve an individual surrendering sovereignty to others. According to him, the social contract was not between individuals and the state, but rather among individuals who refrain from coercing or governing each other, each one maintaining complete sovereignty upon him- or herself:

John Rawls' Theory of Justice (1971)
Building on the work of Immanuel Kant with its presumption of limits on the state, John Rawls (1921–2002), in A Theory of Justice (1971), proposed a contractarian approach whereby rational people in a hypothetical "original position" would set aside their individual preferences and capacities under a "veil of ignorance" and agree to certain general principles of justice and legal organization. This idea is also used as a game-theoretical formalization of the notion of fairness.

David Gauthier's Morals By Agreement (1986)

David Gauthier "neo-Hobbesian" theory argues that cooperation between two independent and self-interested parties is indeed possible, especially when it comes to understanding morality and politics. Gauthier notably points out the advantages of cooperation between two parties when it comes to the challenge of the prisoner's dilemma. He proposes that, if two parties were to stick to the original agreed-upon arrangement and morals outlined by the contract, they would both experience an optimal result. In his model for the social contract, factors including trust, rationality, and self-interest keep each party honest and dissuade them from breaking the rules.

Philip Pettit's Republicanism (1997)
Philip Pettit (b. 1945) has argued, in Republicanism: A Theory of Freedom and Government (1997), that the theory of social contract, classically based on the consent of the governed, should be modified. Instead of arguing for explicit consent, which can always be manufactured, Pettit argues that the absence of an effective rebellion against it is a contract's only legitimacy.

Application

Elections
Jean-Jacques Rousseau argued that societal laws are upheld up the collective will of the citizens whom they represent. Thus, in obeying laws, the citizen "remains free." Within elections, the will of the establishment is the will of the collective. Barring corruption, the legitimacy of the democractic government is absolute.

According to other social contract theorists, when the government fails to secure their natural rights (Locke) or satisfy the best interests of society, citizens can withdraw their obligation to obey or change the leadership through elections or other means including, when necessary, violence. Locke believed that natural rights were inalienable, and therefore the rule of God superseded government authority, while Rousseau believed that democracy (majority-rule) was the best way to ensure welfare while maintaining individual freedom under the rule of law. The Lockean concept of the social contract was invoked in the United States Declaration of Independence.

Courtroom
In court, the social contract is used to diagnose mental health, with the ultimate aim of delivering a fair sentence. Judge John Geoffrey Jones called it "an aspect of the instinct for self-preservation." He saw the committer of bad deeds as the impervious person: that "rare person whose intuition is stunted and who misses out on instruction grows up uninhibited, so continues bad deeds." Jones argued that the legitimancy of the judiciary is not absolute. Rather than the court, it is the psychiatrist's job to diagnose mental health.

Criticism

Consent of the governed
An early critic of social contract theory was Rousseau's friend, the philosopher David Hume, who in 1742 published an essay "Of Civil Liberty". The second part of this essay, entitled "Of the Original Contract", stresses that the concept of a "social contract" is a convenient fiction: 

Hume argued that consent of the governed was the ideal foundation on which a government should rest, but that it had not actually occurred this way in general.

Natural law and constitutionalism
Legal scholar Randy Barnett has argued that, while presence in the territory of a society may be necessary for consent, this does not constitute consent to all rules the society might make regardless of their content. A second condition of consent is that the rules be consistent with underlying principles of justice and the protection of natural and social rights, and have procedures for effective protection of those rights (or liberties). This has also been discussed by O.A. Brownson, who argued that, in a sense, three "constitutions" are involved: first, the constitution of nature that includes all of what the Founders called "natural law"; second, the constitution of society, an unwritten and commonly understood set of rules for the society formed by a social contract before it establishes a government, by which it does establish the third, a constitution of government. To consent, a necessary condition is that the rules be constitutional in that sense.

Tacit consent
The theory of an implicit social contract holds that by remaining in the territory controlled by some society, which usually has a government, people give consent to join that society and be governed by its government if any. This consent is what gives legitimacy to such a government.

Other writers have argued that consent to join the society is not necessarily consent to its government. For that, the government must be set up according to a constitution of government that is consistent with the superior unwritten constitutions of nature and society.

Explicit consent 
The theory of an implicit social contract also goes under the principles of explicit consent.  The main difference between tacit consent and explicit consent is that explicit consent is meant to leave no room for misinterpretation.  Moreover, you should directly state what it is that you want and the person has to respond in a concise manner that either confirms or denies the proposition.

Contracts must be consensual
According to the will theory of contract, a contract is not presumed valid unless all parties voluntarily agree to it, either tacitly or explicitly, without coercion. Lysander Spooner, a 19th-century lawyer who argued before the United States
Supreme Court and staunch supporter of a right of contract between individuals, argued in his essay No Treason that a supposed social contract cannot be used to justify governmental actions such as taxation because government will initiate force against anyone who does not wish to enter into such a contract. As a result, he maintains that such an agreement is not voluntary and therefore cannot be considered a legitimate contract at all. An abolitionist, he made similar arguments about the unconstitutionality of slavery in the US.

Modern Anglo-American law, like European civil law, is based on a will theory of contract, according to which all terms of a contract are binding on the parties because they chose those terms for themselves. This was less true when Hobbes wrote Leviathan; at that time more importance was attached to consideration, meaning a mutual exchange of benefits necessary to the formation of a valid contract, and most contracts had implicit terms that arose from the nature of the contractual relationship rather than from the choices made by the parties. Accordingly, it has been argued that social contract theory is more consistent with the contract law of the time of Hobbes and Locke than with the contract law of our time and that certain features in the social contract which seem anomalous to us, such as the belief that we are bound by a contract formulated by our distant ancestors, would not have seemed as strange to Hobbes' contemporaries as they do to us.

See also

 Mandate of Heaven
 Classical republicanism
 Consent
 Consent of the governed
 Constitution
 Constitutionalism
 Self determination
 Contract
 Epicurean ethics
 Federalism
 Mandate (politics)
 Mayflower Compact
 Monarchomachs
 The Racial Contract
 Rights of Man
 Right of rebellion
 School of Salamanca
 Social capital
 Social cohesion
 Social Contract (Britain) - British Labour Party policy involving trade-offs between employment conditions and social welfare
 Social disintegration
 Lawrence Kohlberg's stages of moral development
 Social Justice in the Liberal State
 Social rights (social contract theory)
 Social solidarity
 Societal collapse
 Consent theory
 Crito – dialogue by Plato
 Juan de Mariana

References

Further reading
 Ankerl, Guy. Towards a Social Contract on a Worldwide Scale: Solidarity contracts. Research series. Geneva: International Institute for Labour Studies [Pamphlet], 1980, .
 Carlyle, R. W. A History of mediæval political theory in the West. Edinburgh London: W. Blackwood and sons, 1916.
 Falaky, Faycal (2014). Social Contract, Masochist Contract: Aesthetics of Freedom and Submission in Rousseau. Albany: State University of New York Press. 
 Gierke, Otto Friedrich Von and Ernst Troeltsch. Natural Law and the Theory of Society 1500 to 1800. Translated by Sir Ernest Barker, with a Lecture on "The Ideas of Natural Law and Humanity", by Ernst Troeltsch. Cambridge: The University Press, 1950.
 Gough, J. W.. The Social Contract. Oxford: Clarendon Press. 1936.
 Harrison, Ross. Hobbes, Locke, and Confusion's Empire: an Examination of Seventeenth-Century Political Philosophy. Cambridge University Press, 2003.
 Hobbes, Thomas. Leviathan. 1651.
 Locke, John. Second Treatise on Government 1689.
 
 Pettit, Philip. Republicanism: A Theory of Freedom and Government. NY: Oxford U.P., 1997, Oxford: Clarendon Press, 1997
 Pufendorf, Samuel, James Tully and Michael Silverthorne. Pufendorf: On the Duty of Man and Citizen according to Natural Law. Cambridge Texts in the History of Political Thought. Cambridge University Press 1991.
 Rawls, John. A Theory of Justice (1971)
 Riley, Patrick. "How Coherent is the Social Contract Tradition?" Journal of the History of Ideas 34: 4 (Oct. – Dec., 1973): 543–62.
 Riley, Patrick. Will and Political Legitimacy: A Critical Exposition of Social Contract Theory in Hobbes, Locke, Rousseau, Kant, and Hegel. Cambridge, Massachusetts : Harvard University Press, 1982.
 Riley, Patrick. The Social Contract and Its Critics, chapter 12 in The Cambridge History of Eighteenth-Century Political Thought. Eds. Mark Goldie and Robert Wokler. Vol 4 of The Cambridge History of Political Thought. Cambridge University Press, 2006. pp. 347–75.
 Rousseau, Jean-Jacques. The Social Contract, or Principles of Political Right  (1762)
 Scanlon, T. M. 1998. What We Owe To Each Other. Cambridge, Massachusetts

External links

  "The Social Contract". In Our Time (7 Feb 2008). BBC Radio Program. Melvyn Bragg, moderator; with Melissa Lane, Cambridge University; Susan James, University of London; Karen O'Brien, University of Warwick.
 "Game Theory". In Our Time (May 10, 2012). BBC Radio Program. Melvin Bragg, moderator, with Ian Stewart, Emeritus, University of Warwick, Andrew Colman, University of Leicester, and Richard Bradley, London School of Economics. Discussion of game theory that touches on relation of game theory to the Social Contract.
 Foisneau, Luc. "Governing a Republic: Rousseau's General Will and the Problem of Government". Republics of Letters: A Journal for the Study of Knowledge, Politics, and the Arts 2, no. 1 (December 15, 2010)
  Sigmund, Paul E. "Natural Law, Consent, and Equality: William of Ockham to Richard Hooker". Published on website Natural Law, Natural Rights, and American Constitutionalism. A We the People project of the National Endowment for the Humanities.
 
 
 
 Jan Narveson. "The Contractarian Theory of Morals:FAQ". On website Against Politics: Anarchy Naturalized.
 A satirical example of a social contract for the United States from the Libertarian Party. Parody.
 Social Contract: A Basic Contradiction in Western Liberal Democracy, Eric Engle. A critique of social contract theory as counter-factual myth.

Political concepts
Social theories
Thomas Hobbes
John Locke
John Rawls
Sovereignty
Social agreement
Sociological terminology